James Allen Howard (born September 11, 1959) is an American retired high jumper.

He finished second at the 1985 IAAF World Cup, tenth at the 1987 World Indoor Championships and at the 1988 Summer Olympics. He won the US national title in 1984.

His personal best jump is 2.36 metres, achieved in June 1987 in Rehlingen.

References

1959 births
Living people
American male high jumpers
Athletes (track and field) at the 1988 Summer Olympics
Olympic track and field athletes of the United States